Morning Spy is an American indie pop band based in San Francisco, California on the Abandoned Love Records label. Morning Spy was formed by singer-songwriter and bassist Jon Rooney and drummer Mark Loftin in 2001. Their sound has been compared Luna, Yo La Tengo and The Velvet Underground.  "Foggy Filter" from The Silver Age was chosen for the Eric Chaikin documentary A Lawyer Walks into a Bar, and "Daughters of History" from Subsequent Light was in episode No. 317 of The Ghost Whisperer.

Original and Current Lineup
 Jon Rooney – vocals, bass
 James Spadaro – guitar
 Allison Goffman – vocals, keyboards, guitar
 Mark Loftin – drums, percussion

Discography
Subsequent Light (2004)
Two Horses EP (2004)
The Silver Age (2005)

External links
Official Website
 Myspace

Notes

Musical groups established in 2001
Dream pop musical groups
American shoegaze musical groups
Alternative rock groups from California